Foot-and-mouth disease virus (FMDV) is the pathogen that causes foot-and-mouth disease.  It is a picornavirus, the prototypical member of the genus Aphthovirus.  The disease, which causes vesicles (blisters) in the mouth and feet of cattle, pigs, sheep, goats, and other cloven-hoofed animals is highly infectious and a major plague of animal farming.

Structure and genome 

The virus particle (25-30 nm) has an icosahedral capsid made of protein, without envelope, containing a positive-sense (mRNA sense) single-stranded ribonucleic acid (RNA) genome.

Replication 

When the virus comes in contact with the membrane of a host cell, it binds to a receptor site and triggers a folding-in of the membrane.  Once the virus is inside the host cell, the capsid dissolves, and the RNA gets replicated, and translated into viral proteins by the cell's ribosomes using a cap-independent mechanism driven by the internal ribosome entry site element.

The synthesis of viral proteins include 2A 'cleavage' during translation.  They include proteases that inhibit the synthesis of normal cell proteins, and other proteins that interact with different components of the host cell.  The infected cell ends up producing large quantities of viral RNA and capsid proteins, which are assembled to form new viruses.  After assembly, the host cell lyses (bursts) and releases the new viruses.

Recombination

Recombination can occur within host cells during co-infections by different FMDV strains. 
Recombination is common and a key feature of FMDV evolution.

Serotypes 

Foot-and-mouth disease virus occurs in seven major serotypes: O, A, C, SAT-1, SAT-2, SAT-3, and Asia-1. These serotypes show some regionality, and the O serotype is most common.

See also 

Animal viruses

References

Aphthoviruses
Animal viral diseases